Little Camanoe is an uninhabited island of the British Virgin Islands in the Caribbean. 

The island provides habitat for the common Puerto Rican ameiva (Ameiva exsul), the crested anole (Anolis cristatellus wileyae), and the big-scaled least gecko (Sphaerodactylus macrolepis macrolepis).

References

Uninhabited islands of the British Virgin Islands